This is a list of amphibians and reptiles found in Antigua and Barbuda, an island nation in the Caribbean Lesser Antilles.  It consists of the two main islands of Antigua and Barbuda, and many smaller islets, including the uninhabited Redonda.

Amphibians
There are three species of amphibian recorded in Antigua and Barbuda, only one of which is native or found on both main islands.

Frogs (Anura)

Reptiles
Including marine turtles and introduced species on all islands, there are 19 reptile species reported in Antigua and Barbuda, with an additional species unconfirmed.  Nine species are present on both main islands.  Six species are endemic to the islands of Antigua and Barbuda, of which five are only found on one island.

Turtles (Testudines)

Lizards and snakes (Squamata)

Disputed or unconfirmed species

Species by island

Amphibians

Reptiles

Notes

References
Note: All species listed above are supported by Malhotra & Thorpe 1999, unless otherwise cited.

.

Antigua and Barbuda
 Antigua and Barbuda
 Amphibians
 Amphibians
Antigua and Barbuda
Reptiles and amphibians
Antigua and Barbuda